Cranfield Mill is a 23 storey, mixed-used development located on the Ipswich Waterfront with access from College Street in Ipswich, Suffolk, England. The Mill was the first phase of the Cranfields Mill development at Albion Quay on the waterfront at a cost of £42 million and was designed by John Lyall Architects and was proposed to be the 'landmark' building of Ipswich. The development had financial difficulties and was never fitted out. The only occupant of the building is Dance East.

Design
The Mill consists of 300 apartments, offices, shops and restaurants. There is a paved courtyard in the centre of the development which provides access from College Street to the waterfront. The towers exterior was completed in 2009 and Dance East moved into the building later the same year through a different contractor. The main tower was designed to make the building visible from the town centre. At the base of the building there are many restaurants that sit on the promenade of the waterfront. The building is also home to the highly successful Jerwood Dancehouse, Dance East which is cladded in dark zinc panels. The apartment complex next to the main tower is built with dark bricks and dark cladding to reflect the historic mills on the waterfront.

The main tower is constructed out of concrete, cladded with white polystyrene tiles with splashes of colour to create a landmark of Ipswich.

Damage 

In October 2013 The Mill was subject to gale force winds causing damage which resulted in a road closure and criticism of the building's design. After a storm, many of the Mill's polystyrene tile cladding was ripped from the south facing facade. The building was assessed as there was many concerns of more cladding peeling off. The damage was not severe but the building aesthetics suffered as the concrete skeleton became exposed.

As of September 2022, the damage has not been repaired but the damaged south facade has had most remaining panels removed due to cladding issues caused by new regulations. There are also still ownership struggles at the block.

Financial difficulties
The company City Living Developments (Ipswich) Ltd had been involved with many commercial and residential projects along the waterfront including The Mill and The Regatta Quay hit financial difficulties after borrowing from the Anglo Irish and Allied Irish banks who went into administration. The project ran out of money and the interior was never completed.

See also
List of tallest buildings and structures in Ipswich

References

Residential buildings completed in 2009
Residential buildings in Ipswich
Buildings and structures completed in 2009